Abrahim Simmonds is the current National Coordinator for the Governor-General’s Programme for Excellence in Jamaica and a recipient of The Queen's Young Leader Award for Jamaica in 2017. Abrahim is also a youth leader and advocate. Abrahim is a co-founder of the youth advocacy group JAYECAN, and previously served as its Executive Director.

References

External links
http://www.jamaicaobserver.com/magazines/career/Abrahim-Simmonds-named-Queen-s-Young-Leader-2017_82476
http://soshinemedia.com/articles/view/229-Abrahim#sthash.gAMbRegY.dpbs
http://jamaica-gleaner.com/article/entertainment/20171020/music-analysis-crucial-media-literacy
https://web.archive.org/web/20170316212747/http://www.kingshouse.gov.jm/index.php/news/977-gg-s-scholarship-competition-awards-9-8m

1994 births
Living people
Jamaican activists